For The Apprentice (UK) candidate, see Katie Hopkins

Cathy Hopkins (born January 23, 1953) is an English writer with over 70 published titles. She has recently been writing for the popular fiction market with The Kicking The Bucket List published in March 2017 by HarperCollins Dancing Over The Hill in January 2018 and Blast From the Past which was published in February 2019. Her latest book, A Vintage Friendship was published as an e book in August 2020, the paperback to follow in February, 2021.

Early life
Hopkins was born in Manchester, but lived in Kenya from the age of five until she was eleven and her family returned to England. She also sang with a rock and roll band named Driving Rock and the Rockettes, which toured local colleges and universities as the warm-up band to groups such as Wizard and The Average White Band.

Her late father wrote under the name Billy Hopkins. His titles include Our Kid, Kate's Story, High Hopes, Going Places, Anything Goes, Whatever Next, Tommy's World and Big Mama.

Books
Hopkins started writing books in 1987, collaborating with cartoonist Gray Jolliffe on a series of humour books. She has had over 70 books published, many in 33 different countries, including the Mates, Dates series, the Truth, Dare, Kiss or Promise series, the Cinnamon Girl series (published by Piccadilly Press) and the Zodiac Girls series (published by Kingfisher/Macmillan Publishers) and the Million Dollar Mates series published by Simon and Schuster. She also wrote four stand alone novels for teenagers which are ''Holy Moley, I'm a Dead Dude'' for Chickenhouse, Playlist for a Broken Heart and Love At Second Sight and A Home for Shimmer for Simon and Schuster. More recently, Cathy started writing for the older market and her first novel for adults was published in March 2017 by HarperCollins and is called The Kicking the Bucket List. Her second title, Dancing Over The Hill, was published in January 2018 and her third novel titled Blast From the Past was published in February 2019. Her fourth book for Harpercollins, A Vintage Friendship, was published as a e book in August 2020 and will be followed by the paperback in February 2021

Cathy Hopkins was shortlisted for the Queen of Teen award in 2010.

Published by Harpercollins:
The Kicking the Bucket List (2017)
Dancing over the Hill (2018)
Blast From the Past (2019)
A Vintage Friendship (2020)

Published by Piccadilly Press:

Mates, Dates series
Mates, Dates and Inflatable Bras (2001)
Mates, Dates and Cosmic Kisses (2001)
Mates, Dates and Portobello Princesses (US title Mates, Dates, and Designer Divas) (2001)
Mates, Dates and Sleepover Secrets (2002)
Mates, Dates and Sole Survivors (2002)
Mates, Dates and Mad Mistakes (2003)
Mates, Dates and Pulling Power (US title Mates, Dates, and Sequin Smiles) (2003)
Mates, Dates and Tempting Trouble (2004)
Mates, Dates and Great Escapes (2004)
Mates, Dates and Chocolate Cheats (2005)
Mates, Dates and Diamond Destiny (2005)
Mates, Dates and Sizzling Summers (2007)
Mates, Dates and Saving the Planet (2008)
Mates, Dates and Flirting (2008)
Mates, Dates: The Secret Story (2009)
The Mates, Dates Guide to Life, Love and Looking Luscious (2005)

3-in-1 books 

Mates, Dates Utterly Fabulous (books 1 - 3) (2008)
Mates, Dates Perfectly Divine (books 4 - 6) (2008)
Mates, Dates Absolutely Amazing (books 7-9) (2009)
Mates, Dates Strictly Gorgeous (books 10-12) (Releases in June 2010)

Truth, Dare, Kiss or Promise series
White Lies and Barefaced Truths (2002) 
Pop  Princess (2002) 
Teen Queens and Has-Beens (2003) 
Double Dare (2004)
Starstruck (2005) 
Midsummer Meltdown (2005) 
Love Lottery (2006) 
All Mates Together (2006)

Cinnamon Girl series
This Way to Paradise (2007)
Starting Over (2007)
Looking for a Hero (2008)
Expecting to Fly (2009)

Published by Macmillan

Zodiac Girl series
From Geek to Goddess (2007) Gemini
Recipe for Rebellion (2007) Sagittarius
Discount Diva (2007) Taurus
Brat Princess (2007) Leo
Star Child (2008) Virgo
Double Trouble (2009) Scorpio
Dancing Queen (2009) Aries
Bridesmaids' Club (2009)  Libra

Published by Simon and Schuster
 Million Dollar Mates series
 Playlist for a Broken Heart
 Love at Second Sight
 A Home for Shimmer

Published by Barrington Stoke:
 Mum Never Did Learn to Knock
 The Valentine's Day Kitten

References

External links
Author's official website
Cathy Hopkins page on the Publisher's website

Review of Mates, Dates and Tempting Trouble
Interview of Cathy Hopkins: 'I wanted to up the glam stakes a bit'

1953 births
Living people
English writers
Writers from Manchester
British writers of young adult literature
English women novelists
Women writers of young adult literature